Georg Herbert Fürst zu Münster von Derneburg (23 December 1820 – 28 March 1902),
also known by his earlier title of Count of Münster-Ledenburg, was a Hanoverian and later German diplomat and politician. He served as ambassador to London 1873–1885 and Paris (1885–1900).

Early life and education
Münster was born in London, where his father, Ernst zu Münster, was the Hanoverian Minister at the Court of King George IV. His mother was Wilhelmine Charlotte von Lippe-Alverdissen, Countess of Münster (a daughter of Philip II, Count of Schaumburg-Lippe and Landgravine Juliane of Hesse-Philippsthal). Among his maternal family was uncle George William, Prince of Schaumburg-Lippe (and his wife Princess Ida of Waldeck and Pyrmont). His paternal grandparents were Count Georg von Münster zu Surenburg and Eleonore von Grothaus (the eldest daughter of the general Ernst Philipp von Grothaus). His grandfather was known for collecting fossils in the Muschelkalk around the town of Bayreuth in Bavaria for more than 25 years.

He studied law at the universities of Bonn, Heidelberg, and Göttingen. At 18, he inherited the family's considerable estate and hereditary seat in the Hanoverian parliament, the Estates Assembly of the Kingdom of Hanover. He also followed his father into the Hanoverian diplomatic service.

Career
From his father, Münster inherited strong Guelph sympathies and conservative viewpoints. During the German revolutions of 1848–49, he opposed reforms and the abolition of privileges for the nobility, and he voted against giving the Hanoverian National Assembly to right to pass laws for Hanover. During the early years of his own career, these family traditions kept him closely attached to the Hanoverian dynasty. Prom 1856–64, he was the Hanoverian Minister in Saint Petersburg, the same post his father had held 50 years prior.  In 1866, Münster tried and failed via diplomatic channels to bring understanding between Hanover and Prussia, and the latter annexed the former as a result of the Austro-Prussian War.

His subsequent rise in the Prussian diplomatic service was met with reproach by the Guelphs, but Münster was convinced that Germany could only be saved by strong Prussian leadership. "My conception of a true Hanoverian," he wrote, "is that he must be first of all a German."  Münster represented the town of Goslar in the Reichstag from 1867–73, when he was appointed by Otto von Bismarck to succeed Albrecht von Bernstorff at the Court of St James's. 

Münster spent the next 28 years in London and Paris, and Münster contributed substantially to smoothing over many minor conflicts between France and Germany. He represented the German Empire at the 1889 Hague Convention, after which he received the title of Prince. In 1900, he was awarded the Order of the Black Eagle. In December 1901, he retired to his villa in Hanover.

Personal life
Münster was twice married.  In 1847, he married Alexandra, Dowager Princess Dolgorukova (1823–1864), widow of Dmitry Nikolaevich Dolgorukov; née Princess Golitsyn, daughter of Prince Mikhail Mikhailovich Golitsyn (1793–1856) and Princess Maria Arkadievna Souvorov-Rimnisky. They were the parents of: 

 Countess Sophie Thusnelde Wilhelmine zu Münster (1851–1933), who married Count Konrad von Beneckendorff und von Hindenburg.
 Prince Ernst Adolf zu Münster von Grothaus (1856–1905), who married Princess Melanie Ghika de Dezsanfalva.
 Count Alexander Otto Hugo Wladimir zu Münster (1858–1922), who married Lady Muriel Henrietta Constance Hay (1863–1927), the youngest daughter of George Hay-Drummond, 12th Earl of Kinnoull, in 1890.

On 22 August 1865, he married secondly to Lady Elizabeth St Clair-Erskine at Dysart House. Lady Elizabeth was the only daughter of James St Clair-Erskine, 3rd Earl of Rosslyn and his wife, the former Frances Wemyss.

Prince Münster died on 28 March 1902 in Hanover.

Honours and awards
He received the following orders and decorations:

References

External links

Count Georg Herbert zu Münster (1820-1902), German Ambassador at the National Portrait Gallery, London
Münster-Ledenburg, Georg Herbert Graf zu|, seit 1899 Fürst M. von Derneburg at Deutsche Biographie (in German)

1820 births
1902 deaths
German diplomats
Georg
Grand Croix of the Légion d'honneur
Knights Grand Cross of the Order of the Immaculate Conception of Vila Viçosa
Recipients of the Order of St. Anna, 1st class